Shenzhen is a city in China.

Shenzhen may also refer to:

 Shenzhen (comics), a graphic novel
 Shenzhen Airlines, airline headquartered in Shenzhen, China
 2425 Shenzhen, a main-belt asteroid
 Shenzhen, a Type 051B destroyer of the Chinese Navy

See also
 Schengen (disambiguation)